In October 2015, German police foiled a plot by neo-Nazis to attack a refugee centre with explosives, knives, a baseball bat and a gun. The group, headquartered in Bamberg, were also found to be in possession of swastika flags (which are illegal in Germany), Nazi magazines, and Third Reich memorabilia. The group were reportedly planning to attack the refugee center on Halloween.

The neo-Nazi group, which consisted of 11 men and two women, had been monitored by police for over a year. Some of the accused plotters were members of the small neo-Nazi party Die Rechte, while others belonged to Nügida, a local offshoot of PEGIDA. According to police, some of them had been "participants and managers" in anti-immigrant and anti-refugee demonstrations.

References

2015 in Germany
Refugees in Germany
Neo-Nazi attacks in Germany